The following is an overview of the events of 1896 in motorsport, including the major racing events, racing festivals, circuits that were opened and closed during a year, championships and non-championship events that were established and disestablished in a year, and births and deaths of racing drivers and other motorsport people.

Events
It was the first year with motorsport competition with 1896 Paris–Marseille–Paris as the first race.

Births

References

External links

 
Motorsport by year